Panchlait is a 2017 Indian Hindi-language social comedy film based on Phanishwar Nath 'Renu''s short story 'Panchlight'. This movie directed by Prem Prakash Modi features Amitosh Nagpal, Anuradha Mukherjee, Yashpal Sharma, Rajesh Sharma, Ravi Jhankal, Brijendra Kala, Lalit Parimoo, Pranay Narayan and Anurima Ghosh in important roles.  Panchlait was released on 17 November 2017. Currently the film is streaming on MX Player.

Plot
Set in a rural backdrop, Panchlait tells the story of a  village community called Mahato tola, that still has no electricity. The storyline is hinged on multiple and layered social interactions and an ethereal romance brewing between the lead characters. The people in this small village lives in darkness, engrossed in their own little sorrows and joys. Panchlait, also known as Petromax,  plays an integral part in a villagers life and possessing one is a mark of honor.  After much efforts, the villagers manage to acquire the coveted Panchlait.  But the villagers are so innocent and inexperienced that they do not know how to light a simple lamp. Their lack of knowledge leads to hilarious situations. The only person who knows how to light the petromax is outcast from the village named Godhan who was falsely accused and thrown out of the Village. The rest of the story focuses on how the villagers manage to lit up the village despite the shortcomings.

Cast
The details of the cast of the film is given below.
 Amitosh Nagpal as Godhan
 Anuradha Mukherjee as Munri
 Yashpal Sharma as Sarpanch Naginaa Mahto
 Rajesh Sharma as Mulgain
 Ravi Jhankal as Sardaar Jagnandan Mahto
 Brijendra Kala as Chhadidaar Aganu Mahto
 Lalit Parimoo
 Punit Tiwari
 Pranay Narayan as Deewan Judhisthir Mahto
 Iqbal Sultan as Collector Mahto
 Anurima Ghosh 
 Punyadarshan Gupta
 Arup Zaigirdar
 Malini Sengupta as Gulri
 Kalpana Jha
 Nayna Bandhopadhyay as Kaneli
 Uma Basu

Music 
The music director and lyricist of the film are Kalyan Sen Barat and Rakesh Kumar Tripathi respectively. The sound designing is handled by Anirban Sengupta. The songs are sung by Javed Ali, Rupankar, Anweshaa and Pt Sanjay Chakrabarty.

Accolades

Notes

References

Further reading 
For more information go to https://www.funtimeentertainment.in/panchlait

External links 

 Panchlait on IMDB
 
Panchlait streaming on MX Player

2017 films
Indian drama films
2010s Hindi-language films
2017 drama films
Hindi-language drama films
Films based on short fiction